Andrey Soares Almeida (born 15 December 1991), commonly known as Deysinho or Delsinho, is a Brazilian footballer who currently plays as a forward for Campeonato Brasileiro Série D side Sergipe.

Career
Deysinho began his football career playing in the Campeonato Pernambucano with Pesqueira (Serie A1), América-PE (Serie A2) and Central-PE (Serie A1). In 2014, he scored a Hat-trick for Central-PE in a 5–0 victory over Ypiranga-PE.

Career statistics

Club

Notes

References

1991 births
Living people
Brazilian footballers
Association football midfielders
Campeonato Brasileiro Série A players
América Futebol Clube (PE) players
Central Sport Club players
Associação Atlética Coruripe players
Murici Futebol Clube players
Fluminense de Feira Futebol Clube players